Blaesodactylus sakalava, the Sakalava velvet gecko is a species of gecko endemic to Madagascar.

References

Blaesodactylus
Reptiles described in 1867
Taxa named by Alfred Grandidier